James "Jim" Rockford is a former Grey Cup champion defensive back in the Canadian Football League and National Football League.

An Oklahoma Sooner, Rockford played one game with the San Diego Chargers before embarking on a career in Canada. He played 5 seasons with the Hamilton Tiger-Cats, winning the Grey Cup in 1986. He also played for the Edmonton Eskimos and Toronto Argonauts, playing 4 regular season and 1 playoff game for the Boatmen.

He has a wife named Eve, and two daughters named Cydney and Lauren.

References

1961 births
Living people
Sportspeople from Bloomington, Illinois
Players of American football from Illinois
Hamilton Tiger-Cats players
San Diego Chargers players
Edmonton Elks players
Toronto Argonauts players
Oklahoma Sooners football players
American football defensive backs
Canadian football defensive backs